The Rio Valley Grande Sol were a professional indoor football team based in Hidalgo, Texas. They were members of the X-League Indoor Football (XLIF) in their final season. The Sol played their home games at the State Farm Arena. They were founded in 2014 as members of the Lone Star Football League but withdrew their team from the league after being taken out of the championship game unfairly after their inaugural regular season.

The Sol were the third indoor football team to call Hidalgo home, following the Rio Grande Valley Dorados which played in af2 from 2004 to 2009. The second was the Rio Grande Valley Magic, which played in the Southern Indoor Football League in 2011 and in the Lone Star Football League from 2012 until their franchise charter was revoked in 2013.

History
The Sol finished the 2014 LSFL regular season with an 8–4 record, tied for the league lead in wins, but finishing second due to tiebreakers. The Sol were to host the 3rd-seeded New Mexico Stars in a playoff game to advance to the LSFL Championship Game, but failed to meet unspecified "obligations" and were suspended by the league. The Sol finished the 2015 X-League Indoor Football season with a 5–2 record, good enough for second place and a slot in X-Bowl II. They folded in 2015, as did the league.

Roster

Head coaches

Statistics and records

Season-by-season results
Note: The finish, wins, losses, and ties columns list regular season results and exclude any postseason play.

References

External links
 Rio Grande Valley Sol official website

Defunct American football teams in Texas
X-League Indoor Football teams
Lone Star Football League teams
American football teams established in 2014
American football teams disestablished in 2015
2014 establishments in Texas
2015 disestablishments in Texas
Hidalgo County, Texas
Sports in the Rio Grande Valley